East Caprivi or Itenge was a bantustan in South West Africa (present-day Namibia), intended by the apartheid government to be a self-governing homeland for the Masubiya people. It was set up in 1972, in the very corner of the Namibian panhandle called the Caprivi Strip. It was granted a self-governing status in 1976. The homeland was renamed Zambezi Region soon after. Unlike the other homelands in South West Africa, East Caprivi was administered through the Department of Bantu Administration and Development in Pretoria.

East Caprivi, like other homelands in South West Africa, was abolished in May 1989 at the start of the transition to independence.

See also

Leaders of East Caprivi
Caprivi Liberation Army

References

History of Namibia
Bantustans in South West Africa
States and territories established in 1972
1972 establishments in South West Africa
States and territories disestablished in 1989